The Cathedral Church of the Nativity of the Theotokos is the largest Serbian Orthodox church in Sarajevo and one of the largest in the Balkans.

The cathedral is dedicated to the nativity of the Theotokos. It was erected at the request of the Orthodox parish of Sarajevo, with construction taking place between 1863 and 1868. The church is constructed as a three-section basilica inscribed in a cross-shaped plan, and has five domes. The domes are built on the beams; the central one is much larger than the other four side domes. The church is arched by round elements. The small gilded baroque-style belfry is built in front of the entrance. The interior walls are decorated by painted ornaments. In the lower zones of the walls the painted ornaments are simulating the marble stone construction look. Arches and vaults are decorated in ornaments only. In 1898, the Orthodox Metropolitan Palace was built near the cathedral.

The head master for construction was Andreja Damjanov, a man from the Damjanovi-Renzovski family of master builders, masons, painters, carpenters, and stonecutters from the village of Papradište, near Veles.

History
The construction of the church commenced in 1863 when Sarajevo was part of the Bosnia Vilayet, itself a subdivision within the Ottoman Empire. Most of the 36,000 dukat construction cost was covered by Sarajevo's Serb merchants, led by Manojlo Jeftanović who donated 2,000 dukats. In a symbolic act, the Ottoman sultan Abdülaziz and the ruler of Serbia, Prince Mihailo Obrenović, each donated 500 dukats. Russian Tsar Alexander II sent expert craftsmen to construct the iconostasis. Known locally as the 'New Orthodox Church' to distinguish it from the sixteenth-century church a few hundred meters to the east, it was the first building to break the Muslim monopoly on monumental edifices in Sarajevo.

Once the church was built, its tower that rose above many of the town's mosques became a sore point with local conservative Muslims who wanted traditional limitations on non-Muslim architecture to be imposed. The same group also objected to a small bell that was installed on the old Serbian Orthodox Church at around the same time. The new church dedication ceremony was scheduled for May 1871; however, a group of forty lower-class Muslims, led by a Sarajevo imam Salih Vilajetović (better known as Hadži Lojo), sought to block it. When notified of the intended obstruction, the Bosnian Vilayet's Ottoman governor ordered the police to arrest Hadži Lojo and his followers. Six were arrested while others fled when the police arrived. Led by merchant Jeftanović, members of the Serbian community lodged a protest with the Russian consul in Sarajevo, and Russian diplomats shortly thereafter protested the episode to the Ottoman sultan. The dedication ceremony was postponed for a year.

The next year, in the summer of 1872, the Ottoman officials dispatched a new military commander with more than thousand men in order to provide security for the church dedication. Concerned about local Muslim vandal attacks, as a show of force the Ottoman governor ordered the positioning of a cannon above the city and the deployment of troops to guard the ceremony. The festive dedication on 20 July 1872, attended by high Ottoman officials and by the young Austro-Hungarian ambassador to Serbia, Béni Kállay (who would later play an important role in Bosnia), proceeded without incident.

See also 

Sarajevo Old Orthodox Church
Sites of interest in Sarajevo
List of cathedrals

References

Books

External links 

  

Serbian Orthodox churches in Sarajevo
Serbian Orthodox church buildings in Bosnia and Herzegovina
Serbian Orthodox cathedrals in Bosnia and Herzegovina
Buildings and structures in Sarajevo
Churches completed in 1874
19th-century Serbian Orthodox church buildings
Tourist attractions in Sarajevo
National Monuments of Bosnia and Herzegovina
19th-century establishments in Bosnia and Herzegovina